Heideweiher is a lake in Hopsten, Kreis Steinfurt, North Rhine-Westphalia, Germany. At an elevation of 45 m, its surface area is 2 ha.

Lakes of North Rhine-Westphalia